Valluvan Vasuki is a 2008 Tamil film starring Sathya, Shwetha Bandekar, Ranjith, Kuyili, Seetha and Muthukaalai and directed by Bharathi of Marumalarchi fame. The story is about the Konar dynasty and much of the shooting was done in villages bordering the Kollidam River in Thanjavur district.

Cast
 Sathya as Valluvan
 Shwetha Bandekar as Vasuki
 Ranjith as Anandha Konar 
 Ponvannan as Thalaivar
 Kuyili
 Seetha
 Vasu Vikram
 Rajappa
 Vadivukkarasi
 K. Bharathi as Kalyanam
 Muthukaalai
 Suja Varunee

Soundtrack
Lyrics written by Pa. Vijay and S. A. Rajkumar.

References 
A critic from Oneindia called the screenplay old.

References

2008 films
2000s Tamil-language films